Murphy Valley is an upland valley on the northeast side of Mount Booth in east Olympus Range, McMurdo Dry Valleys. The valley opens north to Victoria Valley. Named by Advisory Committee on Antarctic Names (US-ACAN) (2004) after Kenneth W. Murphy, Jr., United States Geological Survey (USGS) cartographic technician, a member of USGS satellite surveying teams at the South Pole Station during two winters, 1981 and 1987.

Valleys of Victoria Land
McMurdo Dry Valleys